Pithecellobium pithecolobioides, known as the granadillo de río, is a tree species in the legume family (Fabaceae).

Found in Argentina and Paraguay, it is threatened by habitat destruction; whether it still exists in Brazil is at least doubtful.

Junior synonyms are:

 Feuilleea pithecolobioides (Kuntze) Kuntze
 Inga pithecolobioides Kuntze
 Pithecellobium pithecolobioides (Kuntze) Hassl.
 Pithecellobium pithecolobioides (Kuntze) Hassl. var. harmsii Hassl.
 Pithecellobium pithecolobioides (Kuntze) Hassl. var. pithecolobioides (Kuntze)Hassl.
 Pithecellobium pithecolobioides (Kuntze) Hassl. var. reductum (Malme) Hassl.
 Pithecellobium reductum Malme
 Zygia reducta (Malme) L.Rico

Footnotes

References
  (2005): Zygia pithecolobioides. Version 10.01, November 2005. Retrieved 2008-MAR-30.

pithecolobioides
Flora of Argentina
Flora of Paraguay
Vulnerable plants
Taxonomy articles created by Polbot
Taxa named by James Walter Grimes
Taxa named by Rupert Charles Barneby
Taxobox binomials not recognized by IUCN